Anhedonia is the fourth album by the American hard rock band Burning Brides. It was released independently on June 10, 2008 by the band. The 2009 rock and roll vampire film Suck features two songs from Anhedonia, "If One Of Us Goes Further" and "Flesh And Bone." Brides frontman Dimitri Coats stars in the movie alongside Malcolm McDowell, Alice Cooper, and Iggy Pop.

Track listing

Personnel 

 Dimitri Coats - electric guitar, vocals
 Melanie Coats - bass
 Jeff Watson - drums

References

2008 albums
Burning Brides albums
Albums produced by Dimitri Coats